Call It What It Is is the thirteenth studio album by American artist Ben Harper (with The Innocent Criminals) released on April 8, 2016.

Track listing

Charts

Weekly charts

Year-end charts

References

Ben Harper albums
Stax Records albums
2016 albums